The  is a Buddhist scripture, part of the Pali Canon of Theravada Buddhism, where it is included in the Abhidhamma Pitaka. One known English translation is contained in The Book of Analysis, first published in 1969.

The book has eighteen chapters, and each deals with a particular topic:
 aggregate (khandha)
 sense bases (āyatana)
 elements (dhātu)
 truth (sacca)
 faculties (indriya)
 dependent origination (paticcasamuppāda)
 mindfulness foundation
 right exertion (sammappadhāna)
 base of power (iddhipāda)
 enlightenment factor (bojjhanga)
 path (magga)
 absorption (jhāna)
 immeasurables (appammaññā)
 training rules (sikkhāpada)
 analysis
 knowledge
 smaller subjects (khuddhaka vatthu)
 heart of the Dhamma (dhammahadaya)

A typical chapter is divided into three parts:
 Sutta method: often consisting of quotations from the Sutta Pitaka
 Abhidhamma method: various lists of synonyms, numerical classifications
 Question method: applies the matika (matrix) of the Dhammasangani

References

External links 
Satipaṭṭhānavibhaṅgo (Vibhanga 7)

Abhidhamma Pitaka
Theravada Buddhist texts